New Essays on Human Understanding is a chapter-by-chapter rebuttal by Gottfried Leibniz of John Locke's major work An Essay Concerning Human Understanding. It is one of only two full-length works by Leibniz (the other being the Theodicy). It was finished in 1704, but Locke's death was the cause alleged by Leibniz to withhold its publication. The book appeared some 60 years later. Like many philosophical works of the time, it is written in dialogue form.

Overview
The two speakers in the book are Theophilus ("lover of God" in Greek), who represents the views of Leibniz, and Philalethes ("lover of truth" in Greek), who represents those of Locke. The famous rebuttal to the empiricist thesis about the provenance of ideas appears at the beginning of Book II: "Nothing is in the mind without being first in the senses, except for the mind itself". All of Locke's major arguments against innate ideas are criticized at length by Leibniz, who defends an extreme view of innate cognition, according to which all thoughts and actions of the soul are innate. In addition to his discussion of innate ideas, Leibniz offers penetrating criticisms of Locke's views on personal identity, free will, mind-body dualism, language, necessary truth, and Locke's attempted proof of the existence of God.

Editions 
 New Essays on Human Understanding, 2nd ed., translated and edited by Peter Remnant and Jonathan Bennett, New York: Cambridge University Press, 1996, .

See also 
 Implicit cognition

References

Sources
 G. W. Leibniz, Akademie-Ausgabe (1999): Vol. VI.

External links
 
 New Essays on Human Understanding Langley translation 1896. Pdf.
 John Dewey, Leibniz's New Essays Concerning the Human Understanding – A Critical Exposition, 1888
 The New Essays, slightly modified for easier reading



1704 books
1765 books
Dialogues
Works by Gottfried Wilhelm Leibniz